Achilleas Sarakatsanos (born 3 November 1982 in Trikala) is a Greek football defender. He had previously played for Apollon Smyrnis, Kerkyra, Apollon Kalamarias, Iraklis, Trikala and Larissa. He was also under contract in Panathinaikos but he did not make any appearances for the club.

Career
Sarakatsanos started his career from A.O. Karditsa before being transferred to Apollon Smyrnis. His good performances there gained him a transfer to Greek giants Panathinaikos, that loaned him firstly to Kerkyra and subsequently to Apollon Kalamarias, before selling him to Iraklis for a 30,000 € fee. On 29 December 2010, Sarakatsanos was released from Iraklis. A few days later, he signed at Trikala, the club of his hometown. From 2011, to 2014 he played for Panthrakikos. Since the summer of 2014, he plays for the Thessalian club AE Larissa.

References

External links
 

1982 births
Living people
Greek footballers
Apollon Pontou FC players
Apollon Smyrnis F.C. players
A.O. Kerkyra players
Iraklis Thessaloniki F.C. players
Panathinaikos F.C. players
Trikala F.C. players
Super League Greece players
Panthrakikos F.C. players
Association football central defenders
Footballers from Trikala